Musa Izamutdinovich Taimazov (born 8 April 1984) is a Russian Paralympic athlete. He won the gold medal in the men's club throw F51 event at the 2020 Summer Paralympics held in Tokyo, Japan. He also set a new world record of 35.42 metres. He competed at the Summer Paralympics under the flag of the Russian Paralympic Committee.

References

Living people
1984 births
Russian club throwers
Athletes (track and field) at the 2020 Summer Paralympics
Medalists at the 2020 Summer Paralympics
Paralympic gold medalists for the Russian Paralympic Committee athletes
Paralympic medalists in athletics (track and field)
Medalists at the World Para Athletics Championships